Holler is the second extended play by the South Korean girl group, Girls' Generation-TTS. It was released digitally on September 16, 2014, and physically on September 18, 2014, by S. M. Entertainment.

Background and release

Holler debuted at number 1 on both Gaon's weekly chart and Billboard World Albums chart. As a result, TTS became the third Korean artist and the first female one to have at least two albums at number 1 on the latter chart.  The group previously achieved the number 1 spot two years back, with their debut release, Twinkle.  They made their first comeback performance in a showcase at the Olympic Park’s Woori Financial Art Hall in Seoul, performing various songs, including tracks from their previous album.

During an interview with Billboard, the three singers expressed, "This album was really personal for us and it was fun...to put out a much more raw side of our music...the music we put together has so much more layers, so much more depth to it in terms of sound, choruses or harmonizing together....Our main goal was to not be visually entertaining, but be vocally entertaining."  They further described the album as an edgier, more mature version of its predecessor, Twinkle, and stated, "We want to make feel good songs that are relatable, we want to make albums that are more natural...and speak from the bottom of our hearts."  The trio revealed that Taeyeon took responsibility for the song selection, Seohyun penned the lyrics to the song, "Only U", while Tiffany  served as the visual director to the overall album image and the concept of "Holler" music video.  The release of the album coincided with the broadcast of TTS's reality television show, The TaeTiSeo; thus, some footage of the album preparation was shown.

The group performed various songs for their promotional activities, including "Holler", "Whisper", "Only U", and "Adrenaline". They achieved two "Number 1" wins on Mnet's M Countdown, one win on MBC's Music Core, one win on SBS's Inkigayo, and one win on KBS's Music Bank.  The group made some radio and television appearances such as on MBC's "Sunny's FM Date", or KBS2's You Hee-yeol's Sketchbook, where they sang a rendition of Destiny's Child's "Cater 2 U".

Singles

The single track "Whisper" was released on September 13, peaking at number 4 on Gaon's weekly chart.

The title track, "Holler" peaked at number 3 on Gaon's weekly chart and number 6 on Billboard's World digital song chart. Tiffany described it as "a rhythmical song that has a big brass sound that stands out with a funky groove, soul, and is overflowing with energy". Its music video became number 1 on YouTube’s weekly "Top 20 K-Pop Music Video Chart",  and later the most viewed K-Pop video in America & around the world for September 2014. The song was initially given to Japanese singer Mizuki Watanabe under the title "Hello Me!", which was a B-side of her 2007 single, "Best Friend".

Track listing
Credits adapted from Holler liner notes.

Charts

Weekly charts

Year-end charts

Sales

Awards and nominations

Music programs awards

Release history

References

External links 
 

2014 EPs
K-pop EPs
Girls' Generation albums
SM Entertainment EPs
Genie Music EPs
Korean-language EPs